Karlsson's is a vodka made of potatoes cultivated at the Bjäre peninsula in Skåne, Sweden.

External links 
 Karlsson Vodka

Swedish vodkas